Sadabad or Saadabad or Sa'adabad may refer to:

 Sadabad, India
 Sadabad, Iran (disambiguation), multiple places